Rhododendron caucasicum, the Caucasian rhododendron or the Georgian snow rose, is a species of flowering plant in the genus Rhododendron native to the Transcaucasus and Anatolia. Its hybrid cultivar 'Christmas Cheer' has gained the Royal Horticultural Society's Award of Garden Merit.

References

caucasicum
Plants described in 1784